Lyon is a city in the south of France. The area has been inhabited since prehistoric times and was one of the most important cities of the Roman Empire, Lugdunum. After the Battle of Lugdunum (197) the city never fully recovered, and Lyon was built out of its ashes becoming a part of the Kingdom of the Burgundians.

Antiquity
Colonia Copia Claudia Augusta Lugdunum (modern: Lyon, France) was an important Roman city in Gaul.  Due to its strategic position, the city was founded in 43 BC by Lucius Munatius Plancus and served as the capital of the Roman province Gallia Lugdunensis. The town grew considerably and for 300 years after its foundation Lugdunum was the most important city in north-western Europe. Two emperors, Claudius (Germanicus) and Caracalla, were born in Lugdunum. As a cultural crossroad its Christianization occurred very early.  In Letters from a Stoic, from the first century AD, Seneca the Younger references the complete destruction and razing of the city in a great fire.

Founding of Lugdunum
Lugdunum was founded under a policy of establishing settlements in newly conquered areas, with the aims of ensuring the stability of those areas and rewarding retired veteran soldiers with land and rights. The settlement initiatives were established by Julius Caesar, and included the cities of Vienne, Noviodunum (Switzerland), and Augusta Raurica. The indigenous people in this area were the Allobroges.

Lucius Munatius Plancus a former officer under Julius Caesar, and later proconsul of  Gaul Chevelue, is credited with founding the city in 43 BC. The actual date is debated by historians.

The colony was small and not heavily fortified, consisting of raised land and wooden palisades.
Named by its founder "Colonia Copia Felix Munatia Lugdunum," later, under Emperor Claudius, it was called  "Colonia Copia Claudia Augusta Lugdunensium." The inhabitants then were placed in the Galeria tribe, the freedmen in the Palatina tribe.

Before the Roman Founding

The site of Lyon exhibits many traces of Celtic occupation from before the Roman founding of Lugdunum, including Condate (located northwest of the current Place des Terreaux, along the river) and Vaise. The name of Lugdunum is particularly attached to the Fourvière. Before the founding, the confluence of  the Rhone and Saône was different than it is today: the Saône flowed at the foot of the hill—during the first century AD a second arm of the river was formed and progressively that grew until it became well-defined where the current Vieux Lyon neighborhood now is located.

It is possible that the Romans first settled Vienne and that they provided an initial population nucleus for Lugdunum, but there is no proof of this.

Origin of the Name "Lugdunum"
There is debate about the exact meaning of the name "Lugdunum." The term Dunum refers in High Celtic to a hill or citadel. But the derivation of "Lug" is less clear. Some suggest a reference to the Celtic god Lugh, however archaeologists have not found traces of worship there, only in nearby Condate and Vaise. The root of "lug" may also be "lux", Latin for "light". Others argue that the term may originate from the work De Fluvii by pseudo-Plutarch, Lougoudounon, from "Lougos" which means "raven".

Lyon, capital of Gaul

Situated at a strategic point, the colony quickly became a great city owing to three particular features. First, the campaign by Augustus, in the year 20 B.C., to conquer Germania. For this, Lugdunum was in an ideal location, with a network of roads which directly traced to the city center. This placed it at the center of Gallic communication, and it thus became the operations center for  the northern territories. Second, during the first decades of the city's founding, the administrative organization of Gaul was not complete and governors provided general supervision and management, from Lugdunum to the whole region. And third, the annual meeting of the notables in the confluence of the Gaul, held at Lyon from 12 B.C. on, reinforced the city's political position.

Urban development

Thanks to its location and influence, the city grew and rapidly increased in wealth. Aqueducts were likely built between 20 and 10 B.C., and a large number of monuments were also built during the same period. The oldest theater  in the three Gauls, which had about 4500 seats, was opened in Lyon between 16 and 14 B.C. by decree of Augustus. This theater was later  expanded under Hadrian to include  around 10,700 seats. In 19 AD the Amphitheatre of the Three Gauls was inaugurated, and later enlarged circa 130–136. During the same period the altar of the federal sanctuary of the three Gauls was renovated.

The top of Fourvière hill, the site of the present basilica, was the heart of the Roman city during the apogee of its power. The forum, a temple, and probably the Curia and the Basilica, all were located there. During the second century, a Circus was built, but its location is uncertain: this monument was mostly known through a mosaic which depicted it. Antoninus Pius, about 160 AD, created an Odeon of 3000 seats.

Beyond the famous monuments, the city contained many different communities. Communities of traders thrived; the sailors, vinters, the plasterers, potters, etc. Each community was hierarchically organized, with a board of dignitaries representing the profession, and serving as the authorities of the trade structure. Some also owned their own cemeteries.

The population increased to nearly 70,000 inhabitants. Lugdunum became one of the greatest cities of Gaul, and a very cosmopolitan one. Many people had  Greek names, over a quarter of the population according to  Amable Audin.

Operation and integration within the empire

Since its founding, the colony of Lugdunum had the status of Roman colony of right (optimo iure), its citizens had all the political and civic benefits of the Romans, but they paid more direct taxes. We have no texts of these city laws.

Lugdunum institutions included two groups: the magistrates and the senate. Magistrates were organized into three levels: quaestor, aedile  and duumviri. Normally  a notable rose in position from the first of these to the last. There are some exceptions such as a citizen who became duumvir directly after being a quaestor.

The quaestors were responsible for raising city funds, under the supervision of duumvirs. The aediles were responsible for the maintenance of roads, markets, and public buildings. The duumvirs had judicial functions. It is stated how they questioned the Christians in 177. They also took care of elections and the  Decurion council.

As  Capital of  Gaul, Lugdunum had several important political and spiritual attributes.

The legate of Roman Gaul resided in Lugdunum and managed its three constituent provinces; Gallia Belgica, Gallia Aquitania and Gallia Lugdunensis. From the beginning, the city had a mint. This mint  was promoted to the rank of imperial mint in 15 BC. which was a unique privilege throughout the Empire. It remained until 78 AD. This mint  briefly appeared again during 196-197 and was recreated by the Emperor Aurelian in 274, in order  to fight against the devalued currencies and coin imitations which were very widespread. The workshop was devalued to a  simply suppletive one in 294, when the Trêves's one started to work. It remained active, with some moments of high production, until  413.

The priesthood of the Imperial cult was the highest federal administrative office that the Gallic Roman citizens could be elected for. It was held in Lyon, in a temple of which we do not have nowadays any  archaeological traces. Elected by their cities, the priests held a worship throughout the year, of which the highlight was a ceremony in August. During  this ceremony   delegates from all Gaul came to worship the emperor. The meetings of the delegates were not a sacramental act. People were appointed from this meeting of delegates in order  to form the Council of Three Gauls. Equipped with substantial financial resources, its role was unclear, but could have  served as a bridge between the Gallic elite and the emperors.

Lugdunum, Imperial City

Due to its strategic position and its political influence, Lugdunum  was involved in some major events during antiquity. It was also visited by many emperors.

Augustus visited it three times between 39 and 8 BC. He ordered a highway improvement of Roman Gaul and gave considerable importance to the city by installing the imperial mint in 15 BC in order to  finance his campaigns in Germania. In 12 BC, the Sanctuary of the Three Gauls was inaugurated.

Caligula passed by once, in 39-40 AD with Ptolemy of Mauretania, his cousin. This event was celebrated with magnificent performances  held in their honor.

Claudius was born in Lyon in 10 BC and returned there regularly, especially during his conquest of Britain between 43 and 47 AD. In addition to several archaeological traces of his Passages, his  speech supporting the entry of Gauls in the Senate, which was transcribed on  the Lyon Tablet, was preserved.

Under Nero, in 64 AD, the Romans of Lyon supported the victims of the Great Fire of Rome by sending the sum of four million sesterces. The following year, they were themselves victims of another  fire, and Nero  sent the same amount to rebuild the city. This fire, known only by a text by Seneca, has never been corroborated by archaeological evidence of a fire.

In 68, the legatus of Gallia Lugdunensis, Vindex, revolted against the power of Nero, with a part of Gaul. During this conflict, the people of Vienne besieged Lyon, but had to leave the battlefield after Vindex's defeat. However, Galba, the new and brief emperor, punished the people of Lugdunum for supporting Nero. But, in the political upheavals during the Year of the Four Emperors, Lugdunum found favor with another emperor, Vitellius, who chastised the people of Vienne.

Christianization
Christianity was brought to Lugdunum by the Greeks from Asia Minor who had settled there in large numbers. In AD 177 the Christian community sent a letter to their co-religionists in Asia Minor, giving the names of 48 of their number who had suffered martyrdom in the Croix-Rousse amphitheatre, among them St Pothinus, first Bishop of Lyon. A vault located at the Museum of Early Christianity is presented by the ecclesiastical authorities as the jail of Saint Pothin  The church was, however, to recover quickly, and St. Irenaeus, the successor of Pothinus, wrote works of such length and depth that he could be considered the fourth great Christian theologian (see St. Paul of Tarsus, St. John the Apostle, St. Ignatius of Antioch). In the 5th century this intellectual tradition was maintained by another son of Lugdunum, Sidonius Apollinaris.
Since 2015 the [Museum of Early Christianity - L'Antiquaille - ECCLY] is open to the public.

Middle Ages
In the period that followed the collapse of the Roman Empire of the West, Lyon survived as an important urban centre, and a number of important monastic communities established themselves there. In 843 it was assigned to Lotharingia by the Treaty of Verdun, and then passed to the Burgundian kingdom. It became the centre of the County of Lyon, the lordship of which was conferred by the Holy Roman Emperor .? Frederick Barbarossa to the Archbishop of Lyon in 1157. Although small, the County was influential, by virtue both of its independent status and of its commercially and politically strategic location. The Archbishopric was also important, since Pope Gregory VII had conferred the title of “Primate of the Gauls” on its holders in 1078. It was especially favoured by the Papacy, and several pontiffs were crowned there.  This independence came to an end in 1312, when Philip the Fair annexed the city to the Kingdom of France. However, its commercial significance was unaffected and it continued to prosper. During the first half of the 16th century Lyon also became the base for French political activities in Italy. As a result, it was frequently visited by the French court, bringing many artists in its train.

Lyon was the site of an urban revolt in 1436. A century of devastation caused by warfare was exacerbated by the peace of Arras, which brought écorcheurs to the Lyonnais countryside and Charles VII increased both direct (taille) and indirect (gabelle) taxation. The revolt altogether lasted two months, from April until June 6. The angry crowd targeted two main groups: royal commissioners and their bureaucrats and delinquent taxpayers. The most heavily represented groups among the rebels were barbers and beltmakers, i.e. small tradesmen. Charles VII arrived in Lyon on 20 December 1436 and ordered an investigation of the events that was still pending on 19 January 1437. Steyert claims that three inhabitants were sentenced to death, a barber with maiming and one hundred and twenty citizens with banishment.

During the reign of Louis XI (1461–83) four annual fairs were established, which drew merchants from all over Europe, especially Italy (and Florence in particular). Lyon became a major centre for the spice trade and, even more importantly, the silk trade, following the authorization by François I of weaving privileges, hitherto an Italian monopoly. The Florentine immigrants also made Lyon a financial centre for banking and insurance.

Renaissance
During the  Renaissance  Lyon is a city that is crowded  but whose morphology does not move much. It does not spread, it becomes denser. In the late fifteenth century, the two most densely populated are the right bank of the Saône and,  an urban middle class and corresponding to the old Via Mercatoria, which ran from the bridge over the Saône to that on the Rhone, in a long cross.

The first printing establishment was set up in Lyon in 1472, and it quickly became one of the most important printing and publishing centres in Europe, behind Venice and Paris, producing books in Greek, Latin, Italian, Hebrew, and Spanish as well as French. The works of Erasmus, Rabelais, Scaliger, More, Poliziano, and many other intellectual leaders were published by the Württemberger Sebastian Gryphe, who set up in Lyon. When French policy turned away from Italy in the 1550s, Royal visits to Lyon became less frequent. It was also caught up in the Religious Wars and in 1562 was seized by Protestant troops. Lyon was the location of the meeting that resulted in 1601 in large parts of the Dukedom of Savoy being added to the French kingdom. Lyon lost the considerable degree of autonomy that it had hitherto enjoyed around this time, but its commercial and industrial importance were not abated. During the 17th and 18th centuries its pre-eminence in silk production was unchallenged, and inventors like Vaucanson and Jacquard made far-reaching contributions to this industry. The geographical situation of Lyon meant that many artists and architects passed through it on their way to and from Italy, and their influence is plain to see in many buildings of the period, such as the Hôtel-Dieu and the Loge du Change. During the 18th century the expansion resulting from increased prosperity indicated the need for a measure of systematic town planning, and this was carried out by a series of brilliant planners and architects such as de Cotte, Soufflot, Morand, and Perrache.

When Napoleon I imposed the use of Lyonnais silk on all the courts of Europe the industry boomed. New tenements with workshops were built for the craftsmen (canuts). Lyon was to see the first Conseil des Prud’hommes (labour litigation court) in 1806 and the
first cooperative grocery store in 1835. Between 1800 and 1848 the number of looms in operation increased tenfold, from 6000 to 60,000, and over 90,000 people were employed in the industry. However, relations between the workers who produced the silk and the
merchants who sold it were always uneasy, and Lyon also saw the first worker demonstrations in 1831 and 1834. This was to come to an end with the authoritarian policies of the Second Empire. The wealth of Lyon and its worldwide mercantile contacts attracted banks from the Far East to the city as well as encouraging the creation of banking institutions by the Lyonnais themselves. This led in turn to investment in land in Algeria, Madagascar, and southeast Asia: the port of Haiphong was created with Lyonnais investment.

This concern with non-Christian countries outside Europe had another important effect on Lyon, which was to become the leading centre of missionary activities in the Catholic world. The earliest institution to be founded was the Propagation de la Foi (1822), to be followed by bodies such as the Pères Maristes (1836), the Pères des Missions africaines (1856), and the Soeurs de Notre Dame des Apôtres. In the present century Lyon has moved its industrial base from silk to other sectors, such as automobiles, textile chemicals, and pharmacy, from which it has continued to enjoy a considerable degree of prosperity.

The French Revolution (1789)

The French Revolution put an end to this quiet and prosperous period. In 1793, Lyon chose to support the Girondists against the "Convention" (the government that reigned from September 1792 to September 1795), in what became known as the revolt of Lyon against the National Convention and was considered too royalist. As a result, the city had to endure a 2-month siege. During the French Revolution, 2000 people were shot or decapitated in Lyon. The architectural work was suspended and numerous frontages were ruined, especially in the Place Bellecour neighborhood.

As in all the then French Kingdom, the French Revolution in 1789 brought a brutal halt to expansion. But development was re-vitalized under the Napoleonic Empire. Lyon became an industrial city and pursued its urban development with a distinct preference for the Haussman style prevalent at the time. Though the Canut revolts – revolt of silk weavers – tarnished the era, Lyon enjoyed an undeniable power which it carried into the 20th century.

Modern times

Urban development continued to expand and change the face of the city, with the silk-processing industry playing a dominant role in the economy. By the end of the 19th century Lyon had 310 silk factories with 210,000 workers, and 320 silk traders. Exports went mainly to North America and England, but even to India and China.

During World War II, Lyon was the center of the French Resistance. Klaus Barbie (the "Butcher of Lyon") tortured prisoners for the occupying German forces, for which he was ultimately convicted of crimes against humanity. The post-war period marked the beginning of the race for modernity with a new challenge, the construction of Europe. Lyon acquired a European dimension through the development of the transportation system, hotel and other tourist facilities, cultural establishments and the creation of the Part-Dieu business quarter in 1960.

The 1980s saw a new drive to improve the city's infrastructure. The momentum continues today. Important town planning projects have been completed in strategic locations, while maintaining a policy of preservation of local historical cultural assets. In barely a dozen years, Lyon has become a major metropolis where the successes of the past live in harmony with the goals of the future. These different phases of Lyon's history are engraved in the urban landscape.

See also
 Timeline of Lyon
 Ceintures de Lyon
 Cognet de Seynes
 List of books about the history of Lyon
 List of people from Lyon
 Roman Catholic Archdiocese of Lyon
 Second Council of Lyon
 Traboule

Sources 

 Lucien Musset, Les Invasions, le second assaut contre l’Europe chrétienne, PUF, collection Nouvelle Clio – l’histoire et ses problèmes, Paris, 1965, 2nd édition 1971
 Visages du Lyonnais, ouvrage collectif – Ed des Horizons de France – 1952

Bibliography 
List of books about the history of Lyon

 , Histoire de Lyon et du Lyonnais, Privat, 1975, avec Richard Gascon & al. 
 Jean-Pierre Gutton, Histoire de Lyon illustrée, Toulouse, Le Pérégrinateur éditeur, 2008, 
 Bruno Benoit et Roland Saussac, Histoire de Lyon

 
Christianization of Europe
Lyon